The  is a single-car diesel multiple unit (DMU) train type operated by Shikoku Railway Company (JR Shikoku) in Japan since 2006.

Operations
The 1500 series trains are used on the following JR Shikoku lines.
 Kōtoku Line
 Tokushima Line
 Mugi Line

Build details and variants

Interior
Passenger accommodation in the sets built up to January 2012 consists of transverse flip-over seating arranged 2+2 abreast. Sets built from 2013 onward have a mixture of transverse and longitudinal seating.

History
The first trains entered service on 25 May 2006.

The two 7th-batch cars, 1566 and 1567, entered service from the start of the revised timetable on 16 March 2013.

References

External links

 1500 series details on JR Shikoku website 
 JR Shikoku 1500 series (Japan Railfan Magazine) 

1500 series
1500 series
Kinki Sharyo multiple units
Niigata Transys rolling stock